General elections were held in Costa Rica on 2 February 1958. Mario Echandi Jiménez of the National Union Party won the presidential election, whilst the National Liberation Party won the parliamentary election. Voter turnout was 64.7%.

Echandi was the only deputy for the National Union Party fraction for the 1953-1958 period, and he was in open opposition to the National Liberation Party (PLN) legislative fraction and the executive power presidency of Figueres Ferrer, also of PLN. During the tense invasion of 1955 when former president Rafael Angel Calderon's supporters and their international allies tried to invade Costa Rica's territory and were successfully repelled by Figueres Ferrer’ government, Echandi was accused of been Calderonista and been offered an office as minister from Calderón. Echandi denied it but was put under investigation by the Legislative Assembly. The opposition, encompassed by both Echandi's party National Union and Calderón's Independent Republican left the Assembly in protest. Still Echandi was acquitted and the old loyalties before the war were starting to switch. Echandi as candidate from National Union promised to allow Calderón and family (then exiled in Mexico) to return to Costa Rica and give a general amnesty for all of Calderón's supporters. This gained him the support of the Calderonism, still a powerful political base.

But, whilst PLN's opposition was closing lines, PLN was splitting. After a primary election that was won by Francisco José Orlich (one of PLN's founders and one of the leaders of the 1948 Revolution) his opponent Jorge Rossi left the party and founded a new one called Independent Party. As expected, Rossi's departure and his new party caused a spoiler effect dividing the Social Democratic vote and Echandi won the election with the support of Calderonists.

Echandi did fulfill his promise and allowed Calderón and family to return and passed a general amnesty for all factions.

Results

President

By province

By canton

Parliament

By province

By canton

Local governments

Ballot

References

1958 elections in Central America
1958 in Costa Rica
Elections in Costa Rica